Hypena umbralis, the banded bomolocha moth, is a species of moth in the family Erebidae.

The MONA or Hodges number for Hypena umbralis is 8453.

References

Further reading

 
 
 

umbralis
Articles created by Qbugbot
Moths described in 1884